Kockelellidae is an extinct conodont family.

Genera are Ctenognathodus and Kockelella.

References

External links 

 Kockelellidae at fossilworks.org (retrieved 30 April 2016)

Ozarkodinida families